Allen Victor Wells (January 13, 1856 – August 11, 1918) was a member of the Wisconsin State Assembly.

Biography
Wells was born on January 13, 1856, in Grant County, Wisconsin. He married Laurinda Ann Hudson in 1899. Wells served on the Grant County Board of Supervisors. He attended what is now the University of Wisconsin–Platteville, the Columbia University College of Physicians and Surgeons and Rush Medical College.

Wells died on his farm near Livingston in 1918. A memorial commemorating him was adopted by the Wisconsin legislature in January 1919.

Career
Wells was elected to the Assembly in 1908 and re-elected in 1910 and 1914, where he served on the Towns and Counties Committee. He was a Republican.

References

People from Grant County, Wisconsin
County supervisors in Wisconsin
Republican Party members of the Wisconsin State Assembly
University of Wisconsin–Platteville alumni
Columbia University Vagelos College of Physicians and Surgeons alumni
Rush Medical College alumni
1856 births
1918 deaths